Hora de España, literally "Spanish time", may refer to:

 Spanish time zone. If one crosses the border from Portugal or Morocco into Spain (and at some times in the past, France to Spain), one is on Hora de España, Spanish time.
 L'heure espagnole, a one-act comic opera by Maurice Ravel, which takes place in a Spanish clockmaker's shop and in which people hide inside grandfather clocks. In this case, it means "what Spaniards do with time," or "the crazy way time is handled in Spain".
 Hora de España (magazine), the monthly cultural magazine of the Spanish Civil War, published in Valencia, Spain, from January 1937 to January 1939. In this case it means "Spain's time", the time when the attention of the world is focused on Spain.